Sacred Silence is a 1996 Italian film directed by Antonio Capuano that deals with a Catholic priest, his pederastic relationship with a Napolitan street boy, and the domination of daily life in Southern Italy by the Camorra.  The title translates as Pianese Nunzio, 14 in May and the movie was released in the US with the title Sacred Silence.

Plot 

Don Lorenzo Borrelli (Fabrizio Bentivoglio) is a priest in a poor neighborhood in Naples where Mafia killings are a daily occurrence and most young people see organized crime as a way to earn respect. Don Borelli tries as best as he can to persuade the adolescents that the Camorra is at odds with Catholicism, but has to learn that nothing will change as long as their parents silently accept the Mafia supremacy.

Borrelli's personal life centers on his relationship with a 13-year-old choir boy, Nunzio Pianese (Emanuele Gargiulo), who is not only strikingly handsome but also a very talented musician. Nunzio plans on becoming a priest as well, as the easy life of a priest without worries about the future appeals to him.

The mobsters figure that a child molestation charge is a convenient way to get rid of the incendiary Don Lorenzo and try to get the local authorities to investigate. Meanwhile, Nunzio begins to doubt if he should stay his course or give in to the pressure to denounce Don Lorenzo.

Cast 

 Fabrizio Bentivoglio as Don Lorenzo Borrelli
 Emanuele Gargiulo as Nunzio Pianese
 Rosaria De Cicco as Rosaria
 Teresa Saponangelo as Anna Maria Pica
 Antonella Stefanucci as Sandra
 Tonino Taiuti as Cuccarini

External links 
 

1996 films
Italian LGBT-related films
Italian drama films
1990s Italian-language films
Films set in Naples
Films about the Camorra
1996 drama films
Films directed by Antonio Capuano
LGBT-related drama films
1996 LGBT-related films
1990s Italian films